Marlatt is a surname. Notable people with the surname include:

Abby Lillian Marlatt (1869–1943), American educator
Abby Marlatt (1916–2010), advocate of the civil rights movement
Andrew Marlatt, founder of SatireWire, a news satire website
Charles Lester Marlatt (1863–1954), American entomologist
Daphne Marlatt, née Buckle, CM (born 1942), Canadian poet who lives in Vancouver, British Columbia
Earl Marlatt (1892–1976), American theologian and poet
Frances K. Marlatt (1901–1969), New York assemblywoman
G. Alan Marlatt Ph.D. (1941–2011), Professor of Psychology at the University of Washington
Hamilton Irving Marlatt (1867–1929), American born painter from Rochester, New York
Harvey Marlatt (born 1948), professional basketball player

See also
Marlatt Hall, residence hall at Kansas State University, United States
Marlett
Marlette (disambiguation)
Marollette
Marolt